Sims is a river of Bavaria, Germany, near the country's southern border. It is approximately six kilometers long, and is fed by the Simssee, a small lake. It flows into the Rohrdorfer Achen, close to its confluence with the Inn, near Rosenheim.

See also
List of rivers of Bavaria

Rivers of Bavaria
Rosenheim (district)
Rivers of Germany